West Fargo is a city in Cass County, North Dakota, United States. It is, as of the 2020 census, the fifth largest city in the state of North Dakota with a population of 38,626, and it is one of the state's fastest growing cities.  West Fargo was founded in 1926. The city is part of the Fargo-Moorhead, ND-MN Metropolitan Statistical Area.

Geography

West Fargo is located at  (46.871749, −96.894966).

Climate
This climatic region is typified by large seasonal temperature differences, with warm (and often humid) summers and cold (sometimes severely cold) winters. According to the Köppen Climate Classification system, West Fargo has a humid continental climate, abbreviated "Dfb" on climate maps.

Demographics

According to the 2008–2012 American Community Survey 5-Year Estimates, the ancestry is as follows:

 German 46.2%
 Norwegian 35.4%
 Irish 7.6%
 Swedish 6.2%
 English 5.4%
 French (except Basque) 3.8%
 American 2.7%
 Polish 2.6%
 Russian 2.5%
 Czech 2.4%
 Subsaharan African 2.2%
 Italian 1.7%
 Scottish 1.3%
 Danish 1.2%

2010 census

As of the census of 2010, there were 25,830 people, 10,348 households and 6,823 families residing in the city. The racial makeup was 93.5% White, 2.0% African American, 1.0% Native American, 1.4% Asian, 0.4% from other races, and 1.8% from two or more races. Hispanic or Latino of any race were 1.8% of the population.

There were 10,348 households, of which 36.2% had children under the age of 18 living with them, 52.8% were married couples living together, 9.1% had a female householder with no husband present, 4.0% had a male householder with no wife present, and 34.1% were non-families. 26.4% of all households were made up of individuals, and 6.6% had someone living alone who was 65 years of age or older. The average household size was 2.49 and the average family size was 3.04.

The median age was 32.6 years. 26.9% of residents were under the age of 18; 9.3% were between the ages of 18 and 24; 32.9% were from 25 to 44; 23.2% were from 45 to 64; and 7.8% were 65 years of age or older. The gender makeup of the city was 49.6% male and 50.4% female.

2000 census
As of the census of 2000, there were 14,940 people, 5,771 households and 4,091 families residing in the city. The racial makeup was 96.40% White, 0.42% African American, 1.04% Native American, 0.28% Asian, 0.02% Pacific Islander, 0.67% from other races, and 1.16% from two or more races. Hispanic or Latino of any race were 1.41% of the population.

The top six ancestry groups in the city are German (47.9%), Norwegian (39.7%), Irish (8.3%), Swedish (7.2%), French (5.2%), English (4.8%).

There were 5,771 households, of which 40.1% had children under the age of 18 living with them, 57.3% were married couples living together, 9.9% had a female householder with no husband present, and 29.1% were non-families. 23.7% of all households were made up of individuals, and 5.9% had someone living alone who was 65 years of age or older. The average household size was 2.59 and the average family size was 3.09.

29.2% of the population were under the age of 18, 8.9% from 18 to 24, 34.0% from 25 to 44, 21.2% from 45 to 64, and 6.7% who were 65 years of age or older. The median age was 32 years. For every 100 females, there were 97.4 males. For every 100 females age 18 and over, there were 94.4 males.

The median household income was $44,542 and the median family income was $51,765. Males had a median income of $32,105 and females $22,148. The per capita income was $19,368. About 4.7% of families and 6.3% of the population were below the poverty line, including 7.8% of those under age 18 and 14.8% of those age 65 or over.

Law and government
The City of West Fargo is governed by a Board of City Commissioners, which consists of the President of the Board (Mayor) and four City Commissioners. The current mayor of West Fargo as of 2018 is Bernie Dardis.

City Hall

Staff
Sharon Schacher retired in 2011 after 35 years as the City of West Fargo's finance director. Tina Fisk replaced Schacher in that year. Two new director positions were created: human resources, which was filled by Carmen Schroeder, and information technology, which was filled by James Anderson, both in 2011. In 2015, Tina Fisk was named city administrator, replacing Jim Brownlee.

Building
City Hall's official ground breaking was held on May 9, 1975, in 2005, City Hall was renovated when the library moved to its new facility. City Hall's most recent renovation concluded in 2016, which brought building inspections and information technology under the same roof and included secure underground police parking. The $19 million renovation added 34,000 square feet to City Hall.

Police Department
The Police Department has grown from three officers in 1968, to 61 sworn officers as of 2018. "The West Fargo Police Department’s Mission is to provide quality service to residents and guests of West Fargo, ensuring a safe community by protecting their constitutional rights in the most professional manner possible." Police officers and other city employees enforce West Fargo city ordinances. Heith Janke is the current, as of 2017, Chief of Police.   The previous chief was ousted by the city for inappropriate contact with city companies.  The police department's community programs include Citizen Police Academy, Police Explorers Post 281, Night to Unite, Neighborhood Watch Program, TRIAD and Crime-Free Multi-Housing.

Economic Development and Community Services
Business
"The Business Development Department connects new and existing business owners and operators with city officials, helping to pave the way for the growth and expansion that is making West Fargo part of North Dakota’s new economic frontier." Former Economic Development Director Matthew Marshall "says some of West Fargo’s growth is a reflection of the recent trendiness of the greater Fargo area, which has attracted young workers and families and translated into a low median age that businesses desire." Incentives for businesses include loans (PACE Loan and Flex PACE Loan) as well as "tax incentives for purchasing, leasing, or making improvements to real property located in a North Dakota renaissance zone."

Community
In 2015, West Fargo became a "North Dakota Cares" community. North Dakota Governor Jack Dalrymple has "pledged $500,000 from his executive budget" to support "service members, veterans, families and survivors."

Public Works
Public Works Department oversees streets, sewer and water, sanitation and forestry for the city. "There are eight (8) existing wells within the City. The total pumping capacity of all wells together is 3,500 gallons per minute (5 million gallons per day)." In 2014, Chris Brungardt, the former assistant director, was appointed as the public works director and The West Fargo City Commission unanimously approved a "contract with Twin Cities based Waste Management to start a no-sort recycling program in the city in April."

Fire Department

West Fargo Fire & Rescue is a combination department led by Chief Dan Fuller, of Danvers MA.  The department has 23 career and 45 part-time positions.  The dept has two stations and provides "all hazard" services including fire suppression, community risk reduction, basic life support EMS, hazmat, and technical rescue specialties such as water/ice rescue, high angle rope rescue and tactical EMS.  Two ladders, three engines, two EMS rescues, a heavy rescue, a Battalion Chief truck, a hazmat trailer, two boats, a grass truck, a K-9 truck, and seven administrative cars make up the vehicles in the fleet.  The command structure includes a career Fire Chief, Office Coordinator,  three Deputy Chiefs (Risk Reduction, Operations, Professional Standards), an Emergency Preparedness Coordinator, one training chief, two Battalion Chiefs (one career, one PT), one equipment services tech, seven Captains (three career, four PT) as well as a Fire Department Chaplain.  The department holds an ISO Class 3 rating.

Parks
The West Fargo Park District maintains 30 parks, bike paths, and facilities that include Scheels Soccer Complex, Veterans Memorial Arena, Rustad Recreation Center and Veterans Memorial Pool. A five-member park board oversees the Park District; Barb Erbstoesser is the executive director. West Fargo Winter Days, an annual event, includes a Silver Snowflake Search, sleigh rides and a chili cookoff.

Public Library
The West Fargo Public Library is located in the Clayton A. Lodoen Center at 215 3rd Street East in West Fargo. The library moved into this facility in 2005. Freda Hatten, the first Librarian of the West Fargo Public Library, retired in 1976. Carissa Hansen has served as Library Director since December 2019, following the retirement of Sandra Hannahs who served from 2007 to 2019. Before that, Miriam Arves had been the library director for 31 years. Beyond the circulation of physical items like books, the West Fargo Public Library offers a wide range of in-person and online services to patrons. In 2020, amid calls for worldwide social distancing due to the COVID-19 outbreak, the West Fargo Public Library translated their popular in-person programs into virtual programs calling this new collection of services "West Fargo Public Library at Home!"

Awards
 In 2013, West Fargo was named City of the Year by the North Dakota League of Cities.
 In 2013, The West Fargo City Commission received the American Public Works Association North Dakota Chapter Project of the Year Award for the city's "Storm Sewer Improvement District numbers 4044, 4046, and 4047".
 In 2014, City Administrator Jim Brownlee was "named North Dakota League of Cities Outstanding City Employee of the Year".
 In 2014, Library Director Sandra Hannahs was named North Dakota Librarian of the Year.

National recognition
West Fargo has been a Tree City for over 30 years. Tree City USA requirements include "maintaining a tree board or department, having a community tree ordinance, spending at least $2 per capita on urban forestry and celebrating Arbor Day".
In 2011, West Fargo was recognized as a Playful City USA by KaBOOM!. "Playful City USA is a national recognition program sponsored by the Humana Foundation, honoring cities and towns that champion efforts to make play a priority through establishing policy initiatives, infrastructure investments and innovative programming".
In 2015, West Fargo was named one of North Dakota's five safest cities according to The Safewise Report which uses FBI Crime Report data to rank the safest cities
In 2016, West Fargo Public Library was named North Dakota's Amazing Library by MSN.com

Transportation
West Fargo works with North Dakota Department of Transportation, Fargo-Moorhead Metropolitan Council of Governments (Metro COG), and Fargo Moorhead Metro Area Transit to meet the transportation needs of West Fargo citizens. In addition, The West Fargo Municipal Airport, 6 miles northwest of Fargo, is operated by the West Fargo Airport Authority and has a paved and lighted 3,300 x 50 foot runway.

Education

West Fargo Public Schools

West Fargo Public Schools serves the city of West Fargo, much of southwestern Fargo, the suburb of Reile's Acres, and the communities of Horace and Harwood. Seven West Fargo residents are elected to serve on the school board, these residents govern the school district and serve 4-year terms.

The board voted unanimously on Monday, March 26, to hire Beth Slette, a 25-year veteran of the district and current West Fargo assistant superintendent of elementary education. Slette took over for Dr. David Flowers who had served as superintendent since 2010. Flowers was named the North Dakota Superintendent of the Year by the North Dakota Association of School Administrators in 2012. Holly Ripley, an assistant principal at West Fargo High School, was named the 2016 National Assistant Principal of the Year.

History

The West Fargo School District (then referred to as "School District No. 6 in Cass County") was formed on 9 October 1876. In January 1887, Nina Hall was hired to teach for two months. She was paid $40. "This first school was large enough to handle the pupils of the district until 1910 when it became necessary to build the Fairview School in the western part of the district. The two schools continued to operate until 1923."  In 1922, North School was built, which included two classrooms and a gymnasium. The following year, Jennie Worman Colby became the first principal. In 1939, a new school building was built for grades 7–12. Today the building, The Clayton A. Lodoen Community Center, houses the West Fargo Community High, Clayton A. Lodoen Kindergarten Center, and West Fargo Public Library.

The City of West Fargo's growth has caused the building of new schools to meet the needs of its students. Aurora Elementary School (located in the Eagle Run development in southern West Fargo) opened for the 2007–2008 school year and Sheyenne 9th Grade Center opened on August 27, 2007, in response to the district's growing enrollment and overcrowding at West Fargo High School (2007 was the first year that freshmen were educated outside the High School since 1993). The Sheyenne 9th Grade Center may serve as a second middle school for West Fargo, as it was decided in March 2009 to be voted on by the public. In January 2015, Superintendent David Flowers presented a 10-year RSP Associates demographics study which "predicts the district will continue to add between 400 and more than 600 students each year".

The school district operates two early childhood schools (Clayton A. Lodoen Kindergarten Center and Osgood Kindergarten Center), ten elementary schools (Aurora Elementary, Eastwood Elementary, Freedom Elementary, Harwood Elementary, Horace Elementary, Independence Elementary, L.E. Berger Elementary, Liberty 5th Grade, South Elementary, and Westside Elementary), two middle schools (Cheney Middle and Liberty Middle) and three high schools (West Fargo High School, Sheyenne High, and Community High).

Hulbert Aquatic Facility

In 2016, the school district began construction of an $18.5 million competitive pool facility at the L.E. Berger Elementary School. The facility will include the pool used for the USA Swimming trials for the 2016 Summer Olympics at the CenturyLink Center Omaha in which Michael Phelps and Ryan Lochte competed. The Omaha pool which was built by Myrtha Pools was dismantled after the competition and moved to West Fargo. It is named for the Hulbert family which donated $1 million for the project.

Technology

Since it began in 2009, West Fargo School's Science, Technology, Engineering and Math (STEM) program  has taken top honors in several competitions, including the Technology Student Association State Competition in 2012, the Bison BEST competition in 2009, and students won first place for Best Web Page Design at the 2009 Frontier Trails BEST Regional Robotics Competition 

In 2015, "an education partnership" was "launched to help high school students in West Fargo, Fargo and Northern Cass school districts prepare for college and 21st century technical careers." While a business partnership already exists between West Fargo High School and Microsoft, Cass County Career and Technical Education Consortium hopes to expand to industries to include "agricultural science, diesel technology, health science, aviation, information technology and engineering".

A group of Liberty Middle School students won ‘Best of State’ in the 2014–2015, 2015–2016 and 2016–2017 Verizon Innovative App Challenge.

National awards

In 2016, "West Fargo High School teacher Michelle Strand earned the Presidential Award of Excellence in Mathematics and Science Teaching as named by President Barack Obama."

North Dakota State Teacher of the Year Awards

1996 – Marcia Kenyon, Eastwood Elementary School
1998 – Vickie Boutiette, District Reading
2008 – Verna Rasmussen, Westside Elementary School
2013 – Andrea Noonan, Cheney Middle School
2014 – Aaron Knodel, West Fargo High School
2017 – Nanci Dauwen, Sheyenne High School

Churches
Catholic
Blessed Sacrament Catholic Church
Holy Cross Catholic Church

Lutheran
Faith Lutheran 
Lutheran Church of the Cross
St. Andrew Lutheran Church
Shepherd of the Valley Lutheran Church
Triumph Lutheran Brethren Church

Methodist
Flame of Faith United Methodist Church

Presbyterian
Community Presbyterian Church

Other denominations 
Burning Hearts Church
Changing Lives Tabernacle
Meadow Ridge Bible Chapel
New Beginnings Assembly of God
Prairie Heights
Red River Church
Shiloh Evangelical Free Church

Businesses
The West Fargo community supports businesses through the city of West Fargo and The Fargo Moorhead West Fargo Chamber of Commerce. The city of West Fargo supports business owners through The West Fargo Economic Development Advisory Committee, West Fargo Economic Development Department and City Assessor's Office. The Fargo Moorhead West Fargo Chamber of Commerce is a bi-state organization representing over 2,000 firms and 94,000 people. The Chamber supports its members through "advocacy, education, and engagement".

Technology companies with West Fargo locations, include: 
Applied Industrial Technologies
BNG Technologies
Data Technologies Inc.
High Point Networks
Network Center Communications
Norse Technologies
Razor Tracking
Red Chair Solutions
TrueIT
Digital Famous Media

Newspapers and magazines
West Fargo news is covered in several newspapers and magazines including: 
 Area Woman Magazine 
 Fargo Forum 
 Fargo Monthly 
 Prairie Business
 West Fargo Pioneer mailed free to every West Fargo resident

Annual events
Annual West Fargo events include: 
 Big Iron, an annual event located at the West Fargo Fairgrounds, features farm equipment and over 900 exhibit booths.  Over 87,000 attendees took part in the three-day Big Iron in 2013. 
 Bonanzaville Pioneer Days includes a parade, food, demonstrations and tours. 
 Hamfest an annual event located at the West Fargo Fairgrounds, features presentations and equipment for sale.
 Nite to Unite, hosted by the West Fargo Police Department, is an annual community summer event. Past activities have included Police, Fire, FM Ambulance and Military demonstrations, free food, face painting, mascots and community service display booths.
 Red River Valley Fair includes entertainment, arts and crafts shows, livestock, fireworks and a petting zoo.  
 The West Fargo Public Library hosts its Summer Reading Program to encourage reading for children, teens, and adults.
 The West Fargo Shakers holds an annual New Year's Eve Party on December 31, all proceeds benefit the Back Pack Program.  
 West Fest, held in September, is a community event for all ages, including a softball tournament, a pancake feed, a parade, and firefighter's ball.

Sites of interest
 Big Iron Farm Show
 Bonanzaville, USA

Notable people

 Anthony W. England, NASA astronaut
 Jan Maxwell, Broadway actress and five time Tony Award nominee
 Tyler Roehl, former running back with the Seattle Seahawks and Minnesota Vikings
 Matt Strahm, relief pitcher for the San Diego Padres
 Alon Wieland, businessman and North Dakota state legislator

References

Further reading

Bicentennial West Fargo-Riverside History Book Committee. (1977). Thru the years to '76. West Fargo, N.D.: J & M Printing.
Cushing, N. (2003). West Fargo: A work in progress. Moorhead, Minn.: Dept. of Mass Communications, Minnesota State University Moorhead.
Dodge, R. (2009). Prairie murders: The true story of three murders and the loss of innocence in a small North Dakota town (1st ed.). St. Cloud, Minn.: North Star Press of St. Cloud.
Forness, P. (1994). Seasons : Pleasant pastures on the All-Muddy River (1st. ed.). Fargo, N.D.: Prairie House.
Heritage Publications (Hendrum, Minn.). (2003). A Century of the Red River Valley Fair. Hendrum, MN: Heritage Publications.
Witham, D. (2003). Sharing a legacy: The life & times of Donovan C. Witham. West Fargo, ND?: S.n.
Witham, D. (2011). Always with'em: A life to remember, musings on publishing, politics, and life in a small town. West Fargo, N.D.: Donovan C. Witham.

External links
 City of West Fargo official website
 West Fargo Public Library
 The Fargo Moorhead West Fargo Chamber of Commerce

 
Cities in North Dakota
Cities in Cass County, North Dakota
Fargo–Moorhead
Populated places established in 1926